Emma Richler (born 1961) is a British/Canadian writer.

Biography
Born in London, England, she is the daughter of author Mordecai Richler. She moved with her family to Montreal, Quebec in 1972. She briefly attended the University of Toronto before transferring to Universite de Provence to complete her education.

She first worked as an actress, performing in stage, film and television roles in both Canada and England until 1996, and later worked in publishing before publishing her debut short story collection Sister Crazy in 2001. The book was a shortlisted nominee for the Jewish Quarterly-Wingate Prize in 2002.

Her first novel, Feed My Dear Dogs, was published in 2005. Her second, Be My Wolff, was published in 2017.

References 

21st-century Canadian novelists
21st-century English novelists
Canadian women novelists
English women novelists
Canadian women short story writers
British women short story writers
English emigrants to Canada
Jewish Canadian writers
Writers from Montreal
Writers from London
1961 births
Living people
21st-century Canadian women writers
21st-century Canadian short story writers
Emma
21st-century English women